Olive Deering ( Corn; October 11, 1918 – March 22, 1986) was an American actress of film, television, and the stage, active from the late 1940s to the mid-1960s. She was a life member of The Actors Studio, as was her elder brother, Alfred Ryder.

Early life
Deering was the daughter of Zelda "Sadie" (née Baruchin) and Max Corn, a dentist.
 Her brother was actor Alfred Ryder. She began attending the Professional Children's School when she was 11.

Career

Stage
Her first stage role was a walk-on bit in Girls in Uniform (1933). She appeared onstage in Moss Hart's Winged Victory, Richard II (starring Maurice Evans) and Counsellor-at-Law (starring Paul Muni). She received kudos for her performance in the Los Angeles production of Tennessee Williams's Suddenly Last Summer. Other stage appearances included No for an Answer, Ceremony of Innocence, Marathon '33, The Young Elizabeth, They Walk Alone, and Garden District.

In 1940, siblings Deering and Ryder co-starred in Medicine Show on Broadway. In 1980, Deering and Ryder appeared in The Harold Clurman Theater's production of Tennessee Williams' The Two-Character Play. Although Williams maintained an apartment across the street in the Manhattan Plaza, he did not attend a performance. Deering received good notices for the play.

Film

The films she appeared in included Shock Treatment and Caged. In 1948, director Cecil B. DeMille cast her as Miriam, the Danite girl who loves Samson, in his film Samson and Delilah. In his autobiography, DeMille wrote that Deering was "one whose talent and dedication to her art should carry her very far in the theater, whether on screen or stage." DeMille cast her again as another "Miriam", this time the biblical Miriam, sister of Moses, in The Ten Commandments (1956).

Radio
Deering also appeared on many radio programs, which included Lone Journey, True Story and Against the Storm, playing in more than 200 television programs, including Desdemona on the Philco Summer Playhouse production of Othello.

Television
Deering's early television appearances included co-starring in "The Unconquered", an episode of Somerset Maugham TV Theatre, on November 19, 1950, and appearing in an episode of Suspense on June 12, 1951. Others included the role of murderess Rebecca Gentrie in the 1958 Perry Mason episode, "The Case of the Empty Tin". On June 6, 1962, she starred in "Journey to Oblivion", an episode of Armstrong Circle Theatre. 

She had a supporting role in the Sci Fi series Outer Limits in the episode "The Zanti Misfits", which aired on December 30, 1963. One of her later television appearances was in an episode of The Alfred Hitchcock Hour titled "One of the Family" (original air date February 8, 1965).

Personal life and death
Deering married film director Leo Penn on February 19, 1947 in Los Angeles, California; they later divorced. 

A Democrat, she supported the campaign of Adlai Stevenson during the 1952 presidential election.

She died of cancer at the age of 67, and was interred in Kensico Cemetery in Valhalla, New York. She had no children and was survived by her brother Alfred Ryder.

Film appearances

Radio appearances

Television appearances

References

External links

 
 

1918 births
1986 deaths
Actresses from New York City
American film actresses
American radio actresses
American stage actresses
American television actresses
Deaths from cancer in New York (state)
Burials at Kensico Cemetery
Jewish American actresses
20th-century American actresses
American people of Russian-Jewish descent
New York (state) Democrats
20th-century American Jews